East Seram Regency is a regency of Maluku, Indonesia. It is mainly located on the island of Seram, but also includes smaller islands to the southeast comprising the Gorom and Watubela archipelagoes. The regency covers a land area of 5,779.12 km2, and had a population of 99,065 at the 2010 Census and 137,972 at the 2020 Census; the official estimate as at mid 2021 was 140,271. The principal town lies at Bula, on Seram Island.

Administration 
At the time of the 2010 Census the regency was divided into six districts (kecamatan), an increase from the original four. The first four of these six districts were on the island of Seram; the Gorom and Watubela archipelagoes are groups of smaller islands situated to the southeast of Seram. Subsequently, six additional districts were created in 2012 by the division of the original six districts, and a further three districts were created in 2014, so that the regency is now divided into fifteen districts (kecamatan), of which ten are on the island of Seram and five on the islands to its southeast. These are tabulated below with their present areas and their populations at the 2010 and 2020 Censuses. The table also includes the number of villages (desa) in each district, and its post code.

Notes:
(a) The 2010 Census populations of Bula Barat and Teluk Waru Districts are included with the figures for Bula District, from which they were cut out.
(b) The 2010 Census population of Siwalalat District is included with the figure for Werinama District, from which it was cut out.
(c) The 2010 Census populations of Kilmury, Kian Dalat and Lian Vitu (or Siritaun Wida Timur) Districts are included with the figures for Seram Timur District, from which they were cut out.
(d) The 2010 Census population of Gorom Timur District is included with the figure for Pulau Gorom district, from which it and Pulau Panjang District were cut out.
(e) The 2010 Census population of Wakate (or Kesui Watubela) District excludes the figure for Teor District, which was cut out of Wakate.

References